"I Fell (So You Could Catch Me)" is a song by British singer Shara Nelson, released as a second single from her second solo album, Friendly Fire in 1996 on Cooltempo Records as a two CD set.

Track listing

I Fell (So You Could Catch Me) Part 1

 UK CD Single #7243 8 82754 2 2
 "I Fell (So You Could Catch Me)" (Album Edit) 4:21
 "I Fell (So You Could Catch Me)" (Marc Brown Mix) 5:16
 "I Fell (So You Could Catch Me)" (Mike Peden Mix) 5:44
 "I Fell (So You Could Catch Me)" (Mekon Mix) 5:39

I Fell (So You Could Catch Me) Part 2

 UK CD Single #7243 8 82755 2 1
 "I Fell (So You Could Catch Me)" (Album Edit) 4:20
 "Down That Road" (Radio Edit) 3:47
 "I Fell (So You Could Catch Me)" (Orchestral Version) 4:24
 "Uptight" (7" Edit)

Charts

References

External links

1996 singles
Shara Nelson songs
Cooltempo Records singles
1995 songs
Songs written by Shara Nelson
Songs written by David Arnold